Football has been a regular event since 1989 at the Island Games, the biennial multi-sports event for island nations, territories and dependencies.  A 5-a-side competition for under-16s was held at the inaugural event on the Isle of Man, and the success this minor competition brought to the games meant senior men's football was included on the itinerary for the first time in the Faroe Islands, in 1989.  Women's football was included on the games' schedule for the first time in 2001.

Over the years, the competition has grown in stature, becoming one of the most important competitions for 'national' teams in non-FIFA football, and has grown from a five-team round robin competition to a 16-team tournament. Football was not included in the 2019 Island Games as hosts Gibraltar do not have enough pitches. As a replacement the 2019 Inter Games Football Tournament was held in Anglesey, and was not officially part of the games.

Men's tournament

Results

Medalists

Performances by team
 Blue square indicates host

Top goalscorers

Women's tournament

Results

Medalists

Performances by team
 Blue square indicates host

Top goalscorers

See also
 Non-FIFA football
 List of non-national representative teams in men's football
 N.F.-Board

References

External links
 Island Games results on RSSF

 
Sports at the Island Games
Island Games
Island Games